Die Unverbesserlichen is a German television series. Seven episodes aired between 1965 and 1971, one per year usually on or around Mother's Day.

See also
List of German television series

External links
 

1965 German television series debuts
1971 German television series endings
Das Erste original programming
Television shows set in Berlin
German-language television shows